The Duluth City Council is part of the governing body of the City of Duluth, which is located in the U.S. state of Minnesota.  The council is part of a Mayor–Council Government in which the mayoral administration makes policy proposals to the nine-member Council.  There are four At Large councilors who represent the entire city and five councilors from the city's five representational districts.

The Council elects a president who presides at meetings, who is Arik Forsman.

Councilors as of February 2021:

External links
Duluth City Council official page
Duluth voting districts map

Minnesota city councils
Government of Duluth, Minnesota